Dedumose may refer to:

Dedumose I, an Egyptian pharaoh of the Second Intermediate Period
Dedumose II, an Egyptian pharaoh during the Second Intermediate Period